You Are Adorable, Rosmarie (German: Du bist entzückend, Rosmarie!) is a 1934 German romantic comedy film directed by Hans von Wolzogen and starring Herta Worell, Hans Stüwe and Hans Adalbert Schlettow.

Location shooting took place around Salzkammergut.

Cast
 Herta Worell as Rosl vom Traunsee 
 Hans Stüwe as Frank Quick 
 Hans Adalbert Schlettow as Sepp, ein Holzfäller 
 Trude Brionne as Mizzi, Wirtschafterin im 'Almblick' 
 Gustl Gstettenbaur as Peperl, Piccolo im 'Almblick' 
 Olga Engl as Mrs. Quick, Chefin der Quick-Autowerke 
 Otto Sauter-Sarto as Thomas Loibner, Wirt vom 'Almblick' 
 Ery Bos as Lilian Chester, Tochter 
 Paul Otto as Archibald Chester, Chef der Chester-Pneuwerke 
 Max Gülstorff as Grimby, Franks Kammerdiener 
 Kurt Vespermann as Tom Chester 
 Robert Thiem as Tim Walker, Toms Freund 
 Otto Kronburger as Loisl Huttenschwanderer

References

Bibliography 
 Alfred Krautz. International directory of cinematographers, set- and costume designers in film, Volume 4. Saur, 1984.

External links 
 

1934 films
1934 romantic comedy films
Films of Nazi Germany
German romantic comedy films
1930s German-language films
Films directed by Hans von Wolzogen
German black-and-white films
1930s German films